Norbert Walter may refer to:
Norbert Walter (economist) (1944–2012), German economist
Norbert Walter (volleyball) (born 1979), German volleyball player